PBT may refer to:

Science and technology
 Persistent, bioaccumulative and toxic substances, a class of compounds that have high resistance to degradation
 Polybutylene terephthalate, plastic used as an electrical insulator 
 Provider Backbone Transport, IEEE 802.1 networking technology
 Preliminary breath test, with a hand-held breathalyzer
 Property-based testing, a software testing framework; for example see QuickCheck

Other uses
 Permian Basin Royalty Trust (NYSE symbol)
 Profit before tax, a variation of EBIT
 Progressing Ballet Technique, a form of cross training used for ballet that is uses ballet specific exercises similar to Pilates
 Pittsburgh Ballet Theatre, a ballet company in Pennsylvania, USA